Leptodactylus viridis (common name: Jim's white-lipped frog) is a species of frog in the family Leptodactylidae. It is endemic to eastern Brazil where it is found in the Bahia and Minas Gerais states.

Leptodactylus viridis is common in its few known localities of occurrence. It inhabits wet pastures at the edge of forest, but can also survive in wet fields outside forest. It breeds in temporary pools.

References

viridis
Endemic fauna of Brazil
Amphibians of Brazil
Amphibians described in 1973
Taxonomy articles created by Polbot